Nicole Woods (born July 7, 1996) is an American women's field hockey player. Woods debuted for the United States national team in 2017, following her performances in the national junior team.

Woods first represented the United States junior national team at the 2016 Junior Pan American Cup in Tacarigua, Trinidad and Tobago. From this tournament, the team qualified for the 2016 Junior World Cup, where Woods also represented the United States.

Woods debuted for the United States senior team in 2017 in a test series against Ireland, in Lancaster.

Woods was a member of the United States team at the 2017 Pan American Cup. At the tournament, the team's historic semi-final defeat against Chile relegated the USA from the final for the first time ever.
She has a sister

References

1996 births
American female field hockey players
Female field hockey forwards
Living people
Louisville Cardinals field hockey players
Sportspeople from Beverly, Massachusetts